The North Devon Football League is a football competition based in England. It was established in 1904. The top division of this league, which is the Premier Division, sits at level 12 of the English football league system and is a feeder to the new Devon Football League since 2019, and prior to that, the South West Peninsula League. The North Devon Gazette sponsors the league and so the full, sponsored name of the league is the North Devon Gazette Football League.

The league covers a 50-mile radius from Barnstaple.

2022–23 Members
Premier Division
Appledore Lions
Boca Seniors
Bradworthy
Braunton Reserves
Chittlehampton
Combe Martin
Eastside
Hartland Clovelly
Kilkhampton
North Molton Sports Club Reserves
Park United
Shamwickshire Rovers
Torrington Reserves

Senior Division
Appledore Reserves
Barum United
Braunton 3rds
Fremington Reserves
Hartland Clovelly Reserves
Holsworthy Reserves
Ilfracombe Town Reserves
Landkey Town
Sandymere Blues
Shebbear United
Torridgeside Reserves
Woolsery

Intermediate Division One
AFC Dumnonii
Bideford Reserves
Braunton 4ths
Combe Martin Reserves
Georgeham & Croyde Rovers
Kingsley Wizards
Lynton
Merton
Northam Lions
Putford
South Molton

Intermediate Division Two
Bideford 3rds
Bridgerule
Hartland Clovelly 3rds
High Bickington
Kingsley Park
Langtree Lions
Morwenstow
Northam Lions Reserves
SAS Equalizers
Shamwickshire Rovers Reserves
Shebbear United Reserves

Old divisions
Here are the old divisions of the league which have since become defunct:

Division Two – The division below the Premier Division, which ran from 1904 to 1958.
Division Three – The division below Division Two, which ran from 1921 to 1951.
Intermediate Division Three – The division below Intermediate Division Two, which ran from 2018 to 2022.
Intermediate Division Four – The division below Intermediate Division Three, which ran from 1971 to 1981.
Minor Division – The division below every other division in the league, which ran from 1934 to 1983.

Recent divisional Champions

The 2000–01 season was abandoned due to an outbreak of foot and mouth disease in the area.
The 2019–20 and 2020–21 seasons were abandoned due to the COVID-19 pandemic.

League Champions by team since 1904

References

External links
Official website

 
1904 establishments in England
Football leagues in England
Football in Devon
North Devon
Sports leagues established in 1904